Turgeon is a surname.

Turgeon may also refer to:

 Turgeon (horse), a French thoroughbred racehorse
 Turgeon River (Harricana River), a tributary of the Harricana River, Quebec, Canada
 Turgeon River (rivière des Hurons), a river in Stoneham-et-Tewkesbury, Quebec, Canada
 Lake Turgeon, a freshwater body in the Northwest province of Quebec, Canada

See also